The  is an Independent Administrative Institution formed on October 1, 2005 by a merger of two previous semi-governmental organizations.  While it inherited the activities of both JNC and JAERI, it also inherited the nickname of JAERI, "Genken" 原研, an abbreviated word for "nuclear research".

On April 10, 2007, JAEA officially joined the GNEP alliance.  The other members in the alliance are Areva, Washington Group International and BWX.  It is expected that the experience gained from the Rokkasho centrifuge enrichment plant will be a key contribution from JAEA.

On April 1, 2016, JAEA transferred some of its laboratories to the National Institute of Radiological Sciences (NIRS), and the NIRS body was renamed to the National Institutes for Quantum and Radiological Science and Technology (QST) which includes existing laboratories of the NIRS.

In 2018 JAEA estimated it would need about 1.9 trillion yen ($17.1 billion) to decommission 79 facilities over 70 years.

Overview
Establishment: October 2005
Founding Law: The Japan Atomic Energy Agency Law
Headquarters: Tokai-mura
Permanent Staff: 4386 people as of October 2005
Board Chairman: 岡﨑俊雄 Inaugurated January 2007

Locations and facilities
The following is an incomplete list of its activities, sorted by location:

Tokai-mura facilities
JAEA has several facilities located in Tōkai, Ibaraki Prefecture, which was the first center in Japan for nuclear research.  Currently, JAEA has expanded to several other sites in the Ibaraki Prefecture as well as all of Japan.
Tokai R&D Center
Nuclear Science Research Institute
Nuclear Fuel Cycle Engineering Laboratories
The Japan Proton Accelerator Research Complex ( or J-PARC for short) houses many particle research facilities.

Tsuruga facilities
JAEA has another head base in Tsuruga, Fukui Prefecture. It is a fast breeder reactor center and a Research and Development (R&D) center.

Oarai R&D Center
This center is located in Ōarai, Ibaraki Prefecture, close to, but not at the same site as Tokai-mura.  It houses the Jōyō reactor, the Japan Materials Testing Reactor, the new High-temperature engineering test reactor, an environmental reactivity monitoring center, and a children's museum.

Ningyo-toge Environmental Engineering Center (人形峠環境技術センター)
This is a small uranium refining and conversion plant, as well as a small centrifuge enrichment demonstration plant located in Kamisaibara, Okayama Prefecture.  The center deals with front-end issues of the nuclear fuel cycle.

Aomori R&D Center (青森研究開発センター)
The Aomori Research and Development Center is spread out over Rokkasho , Aomori Prefecture and Mutsu, Aomori Prefecture. The Rokkasho site does work with fusion research, notably a fusion reactor design research institute, a particle accelerator, and a materials irradiation test facility. The facilities in Mutsu include a museum, an ocean monitoring facility, and radioactive waste management.

JAEA also co-operates and provides support for the activities of Japan Nuclear Fuel Limited with their reprocessing facility and Uranium enrichment facility plans.

Horonobe Underground Research Center
The Horonobe URL carries out research and development on geoscientific study and on geological disposal for high-level radioactive waste. It is expected that this site will become Japan's national Deep geological repository for nuclear waste.

Fugen

Tono Geoscience Center (東濃地科学センター)
This is located in Tōnō, Gifu Prefecture.

See also

 2011 Japanese nuclear accidents
 Fukushima I nuclear accidents
 Independent Administrative Institution
 Japanese nuclear incidents
 Japanese reaction to Fukushima I nuclear accidents
 List of Independent Administrative Institutions (Japan)
 Nuclear power in Japan

References

External links
JAEA English Homepage
Horonobe Underground Research Center English Homepage

 

Nuclear technology organizations of Japan
Research institutes in Japan
Nuclear research institutes
Independent Administrative Institutions of Japan
Ibaraki Prefecture
2005 establishments in Japan